Vindicius was a Roman slave. He was said to be the person who discovered papers exposing Tarquin's plot to regain power, after the overthrowal of the Roman Monarchy. These papers proved that Tarquin, who had been attempting to have his possessions legally restored to him, was doing so in order to be allowed into Rome again, allowing him to kill consuls Lucius Collatinus and Brutus, and reinstall himself. Vindicius gave these papers to Publius Valerius Publicola on account of the "affable and kindly ways of the man."

Vindicius was later vindicated for this actions for the Republic. He was given the property which was about to restored to Tarquin. Livy claims his name is the etymological root of the word vindication.

References

6th-century BC Romans
Ancient Roman slaves and freedmen